Friburn & Urik is a house music duo of producers and remixers, consisting of Ronen "Friburn" Horin and Yuval Urik.  In addition to their extensive remix work, they began having hits as artists on the Hot Dance Music/Club Play chart in 1999.  They have hit #1 twice: in 2003 with "Dance To the Rhythm" and in 2005 with "Show It."

Their first US release "You Got My Love" was released on Subculture Records, and Underground House Label started by Joe Izzo and Marc Salina. "You Got My Love" was a solid club hit for the duo and garnered the attention of the House Music community.

See also
List of number-one dance hits (United States)
List of artists who reached number one on the US Dance chart

External links
Discogs

Remixers
American electronic music groups
American dance music groups
American house music groups